Joel Padilla Peña (born 22 July 1959) is a Mexican politician affiliated with the Labor Party who will serve as a senator in the LXIV Legislature of the Mexican Congress. He also was a proportional representation federal deputy in the LIX Legislature.

References

1959 births
Living people
Politicians from Nayarit
Members of the Chamber of Deputies (Mexico)
Labor Party (Mexico) politicians
21st-century Mexican politicians
Members of the Congress of Colima
Autonomous University of Nayarit alumni
University of Colima alumni
Members of the Senate of the Republic (Mexico) for Colima
Deputies of the LIX Legislature of Mexico
Senators of the LXIV and LXV Legislatures of Mexico